Aynalıkavak Pavilion is a former Ottoman pavilion located in the Hasköy neighborhood of Beyoğlu district in Istanbul, Turkey. It was constructed during the reign of Sultan Ahmed I (1603–1617), with various additions and changes over time. It is under the administration of the Turkish Directorate of National Palaces.

See also
 Ottoman architecture

References
 Sema Öner. Aynalıkavak Pavilion. TBMM. Istanbul, 1994.

External links
 Directorate of National Palaces | Aynalıkavak Pavilion

Ottoman palaces in Istanbul
Museums in Istanbul
Golden Horn
Beyoğlu